{{DISPLAYTITLE:C6334H9792N1700O2000S42}}
The molecular formula C6334H9792N1700O2000S42 (molar mass: 143.1 kg/mol) may refer to:

 Drozitumab
 Enavatuzumab

Molecular formulas